is passenger Shinkansen railway station located in the city of Honjō, Saitama, Japan, operated by East Japan Railway Company (JR East).

Lines

Station layout
The elevated station has two side platforms serving two tracks for stopping trains, with two centre tracks for non-stop trains. The station has a "Midori no Madoguchi" staffed ticket office.

Platforms

History
Honjō-Waseda Station opened on 13 March 2004.

Passenger statistics
In fiscal 2019, the station was used by an average of 2233 passengers daily (boarding passengers only).  The passenger figures for previous years are as shown below.

Bus routes
Musashi Kanko
For Honjo Station (Saitama)
For Yorii Station
Kokusai Juo Bus
Honjo Station (Saitama)
Isesaki Station

See also
 List of railway stations in Japan

References

External links

 JR East Station Information 
 Honjō-Waseda Station (Saitama Prefectural Government) 

Railway stations in Saitama Prefecture
Stations of East Japan Railway Company
Jōetsu Shinkansen
Railway stations in Japan opened in 2004
Honjō, Saitama